Dunama angulinea is a moth in the  family Notodontidae. It is found in Costa Rica, where it is found in the Limon Province. The distribution follows the Caribbean coast and there are no records farther inland.

The length of the forewings is 11.2–12.2 mm. The forewing dorsal ground color is a mixture of gray-brown, reddish-brown, and beige-colored scales. The veins are lined with gray, especially distally. The anal fold and cubitus are reddish brown and the orbicular spot is diffuse reddish brown. The reniform spot is small and reddish brown. The ventral surfaces of both wings are gray brown. The dorsal hindwing is dirty gray brown, but lighter near base.

References

Moths described in 1912
Notodontidae